Dohar is an upazila of Dhaka District in the division of Dhaka, Bangladesh. The upazila is situated in the southernmost part of Dhaka District. The Padma River borders the southern part of the upazila.

History
During the British period, farmers in this area were forced to cultivate nil (indigo) and joined the indigo rebellion. Mahatma Gandhi visited the area in 1940.

Geography
It has 31,645 households and a total area of 161.49 km2.
One of the largest rivers of Bangladesh, the Padma, is situated in the southern, south central-western and south-western part of Dohar. This upazila is bordered by Nawabganj, Sri Nagar and a small part of Sirajdikhan, which is an upazila of the district Munshiganj (formerly known as Bikrampur). North side Manikgonj Dist. and West side is Padma river/Faridpur Dist.

Demographics
As of the 2011 Bangladesh census, Dohar has a population of 2,26,439. Males constituted 47.27% of the population and females 52.73%. This upazila's eighteen-up population is 1,51,770. Dohar had an average literacy rate of 32.9% (7+ years) compared with the national average of 32.4% literacy. The rate of literacy is increasing nowadays.

Points of interest
The sandy beach at Moinot Ghat, on the Padma River, is a day trip destination for Dhakaites.

Administration
Dohar Upazila is divided into Dohar Municipality and eight union parishads: Bilaspur, Kushumhati, Mahmudpur, Muksudpur, Narisha, Nayabari, Roypara, and Sutarpara. The union parishads are subdivided into 91 mauzas and 133 villages.

Dohar Municipality is subdivided into 9 wards and 26 mahallas.

References

Upazilas of Dhaka District